Cornish City was the name of five ships operated by Sir W R Smith & Sons Ltd (Reardon Smith Line).

, captured and scuttled during the First World War
, sold in 1929, seized in 1940 and placed under the management of Reardon Smith as Fort Binger until returned to owners in 1944
, ex Empire Cheer, managed during the Second World War and purchased in 1946, scrapped 1963
, sold in 1977

Cornish City